Tolbert "Red" Brown was a college football player. He was the brother of Johnny Mack Brown. Brown was selected All-Southern by some writers in 1926.

Early years
Brown was a native of Dothan, Alabama, the third of nine children. He was captain of the Dothan High football team in 1923.

University of Alabama

1925
Brown played at end, while his brother "Mack" played at halfback in 1925.

References

Sportspeople from Dothan, Alabama
All-Southern college football players
Alabama Crimson Tide football players
American football ends
American football halfbacks